Angels of the Universe is a 1993 novel by Icelandic author Einar Már Guðmundsson. It won the Nordic Council's Literature Prize in 1995.

In 2000, it was adapted into the feature film Angels of the Universe.

References

1995 novels
Icelandic novels
Icelandic-language novels
Nordic Council's Literature Prize-winning works